Radik Valiev (born 18 June 1997) is a Russian freestyle wrestler of Ossetian ethnicity.  Valiev won one of the bronze medals in the men's 79 kg event at the 2021 World Wrestling Championships held in Oslo, Norway.  In 2022, Valiev won a gold medal at the annually held prestigious tournament, the Ivan Yarygin Golden Gran Prix, held in Krasnoyarsk, Russia.

References

External links 
 

Living people
Place of birth missing (living people)
Russian male sport wrestlers
World Wrestling Championships medalists
1997 births
21st-century Russian people